The Omega Stone  is a Microsoft Windows  puzzle adventure game developed by American studio Omni World Studios. It was the sequel to the game Riddle of the Sphinx: An Egyptian Adventure and was released by DreamCatcher Interactive on March 19, 2003.

Gameplay

Plot
In The Omega Stone, players embark on an adventure to solve an ancient mystery, visiting locations such as the Great Sphinx of Giza, Stonehenge, Easter Island and even the ruins of Atlantis in the process. You travel to these sites with the use of passes where you investigate the area for clues on the location of 5 "Omega Discs". The locations of these, in addition to those already mentioned, include beneath  the Bermuda Triangle (although where is unknown), inside the manor of an English Lord, inside the pyramid of Chichen Itza and a within a Druidic Compound.

Development

Reception

The game received "average" reviews according to the review aggregation website Metacritic. According to PC Data, The Omega Stones sales in North America totaled 29,400 units by the end of 2003.

References

External links
Official The Omega Stone website

The Omega Stone at TopTenReviews
The Omega Stone  on Old World Studios official website.

2003 video games
Adventure games
MacOS games
Video games developed in the United States
Video games set in Atlantis
Video games set in Easter Island
Video games set in Egypt
Video games set in Mexico
Windows games
The Adventure Company games
Riddle of the Sphinx